Vasco Reis Peixe Sanona Coelho (born 5 May 1994) is a Portuguese footballer who plays as a centre back for S.C. Olhanense.

Football career
On 29 July 2017, Coelho made his professional debut with Real in a 2017–18 Taça da Liga match against Belenenses.

References

External links

Portuguese League profile 

1994 births
Living people
People from Évora
Portuguese footballers
Portuguese expatriate footballers
Association football defenders
Liga Portugal 2 players
Saudi First Division League players
Real S.C. players
S.C. Braga B players
Casa Pia A.C. players
S.C. Farense players
Al-Washm Club players
C.D. Fátima players
S.C. Olhanense players
Portuguese expatriate sportspeople in Saudi Arabia
Expatriate footballers in Saudi Arabia
Sportspeople from Évora District